This is a list of episodes for the eighth season (1957–58) of the television version of The Jack Benny Program.

Episodes

References
 
 

1957 American television seasons
1958 American television seasons
Jack 08